{{DISPLAYTITLE:C18H19ClN4}}
The molecular formula C18H19ClN4 (molar mass: 326.82 g/mol, exact mass: 326.1298 u) may refer to:

 Clozapine
 L-745,870

Molecular formulas